The Vandal Kingdom or Kingdom of the Vandals and Alans was a confederation of Vandals and Alans, which is described as one of the barbarian kingdoms established under Gaiseric, a Vandal warrior. It ruled in North Africa and the Mediterranean from 435 to 534 AD.

In 429 AD, the Vandals, estimated to number 80,000 people, had crossed by boat from Hispania to North Africa. They advanced eastward, conquering the coastal regions of what is now Morocco, Algeria, and Tunisia. In 435, the Roman Empire, then ruling North Africa, allowed the Vandals to settle in the provinces of Numidia and Mauretania when it became clear that the Vandal army could not be defeated by Roman military forces. In 439 the Vandals renewed their advance eastward and captured Carthage, the most important city of North Africa. The fledgling kingdom then conquered the Roman-ruled islands of Mallorca, Sicily, Sardinia, and Corsica in the western Mediterranean. In the 460s, the Romans launched two unsuccessful military expeditions by sea in an attempt to overthrow the Vandals and reclaim North Africa. The conquest of North Africa by the Vandals was a blow to the beleaguered Western Roman Empire as North Africa was a major source of revenue and a supplier of grain (mostly wheat) to the city of Rome.

Although primarily remembered for the sack of Rome in 455 and their persecution of Nicene Christians in favor of Arian Christianity, the Vandals were also patrons of learning. Grand building projects continued, schools flourished, and North Africa fostered many of the most innovative writers and natural scientists of the late Latin-speaking Western Roman Empire.

The Vandal Kingdom ended in 534, when it was conquered by Belisarius in the Vandalic War and incorporated into the Eastern Roman Empire (or Byzantine Empire). The surviving Vandals either assimilated into the indigenous African population or were dispersed among the Byzantine territories.

History

Establishment 

The Vandals, under their new king Gaiseric (also known as Genseric or Geiseric), crossed to Africa in 429, beginning the Vandalic conquest of Roman Africa. Although their numbers are unknown and some historians debate the validity of estimates, based on Procopius's assertion that the Vandals and Alans numbered 80,000 when they moved to North Africa, Peter Heather estimates that they could have fielded an army of around 15,000–20,000. According to Procopius, the Vandals came to Africa at the request of Bonifacius, the military ruler of the region. However, it has been suggested that the Vandals migrated to Africa in search of safety; they had been attacked by a Roman army in 422 and had failed to seal a treaty with them. Advancing eastward along the African coast, the Vandals laid siege to the walled city of Hippo Regius in 430. Inside, Saint Augustine and his priests prayed for relief from the Arian Christian invaders, knowing that the fall of the city would spell conversion or death for many Nicene Christians. On 28 August 430, three months into the siege, the 75-year-old St. Augustine died — perhaps from starvation or stress, as the wheat fields outside the city lay dormant and unharvested. After 14 months, hunger and disease were ravaging both the city's inhabitants and the Vandals outside the walls. The city eventually fell to the Vandals, who made it their first capital.
Peace was made between the Romans and the Vandals in 435 through a treaty between Valentinian III and Gaiseric, giving the Vandals control of coastal Numidia and parts of Mauretania. Gaiseric chose to break the treaty in 439 when he invaded the province of Africa Proconsularis and laid siege to Carthage. The city was captured without a fight; the Vandals entered it while most of the inhabitants were attending the races at the hippodrome. Gaiseric made it his capital and styled himself the King of the Vandals and Alans, to denote the inclusion of his Alan allies into his realm. Conquering Sicily, Sardinia, Corsica, Malta, and the Balearic Islands, he built his kingdom into a powerful state. Averil Cameron suggests that the new Vandal rule may not have been unwelcome to the population of North Africa, as the previous landowners were generally unpopular.The impression given by sources such as Victor of Vita, Possidius, Quodvultdeus, and Fulgentius of Ruspe was that the Vandal takeover of Carthage and North Africa led to widespread destruction. However, recent archaeological investigations have challenged this assertion. Although Carthage's odeon was destroyed, the street grid remained the same, and some public buildings were renovated. The political centre of Carthage was Byrsa Hill. New industrial centres emerged in towns during this period. Historian Andy Merrills uses the large amounts of African red slip ware discovered across the Mediterranean that dates from the Vandal period of North Africa to challenge the assumption that Vandal rule of North Africa was a time of economic instability. When the Vandals raided Sicily in 440, the Western Roman Empire was too preoccupied with war in Gaul to react. Theodosius II, emperor of the Eastern Roman Empire, dispatched an expedition to deal with the Vandals in 441, but it progressed only as far as Sicily. The Western Empire under Valentinian III secured peace with the Vandals in 442. Under the treaty, the Vandals gained Byzacena, Tripolitania, and part of Numidia and confirmed their control of Proconsular Africa.

The grain trade

Historians since Edward Gibbon have seen the capture of North Africa by the Vandals and Alans as the "deathblow" and "the greatest single blow" to the Western Roman Empire in its struggle to survive. Prior to the Vandals, northern Africa was prosperous and peaceful, requiring only a small percentage of the Roman Empire's military forces, and was an important source of taxes for the empire and grain for the city of Rome. The scholar Josephus in the 1st century AD said that North Africa fed Rome for eight months of the year, with the other four months of needed grain coming from Egypt.

The Roman need for grain from North Africa may have declined by the 5th century because the population of the city of Rome had fallen, and the number of Roman soldiers had decreased. The treaty in 442 between Rome and the Vandals seems to have ensured that grain shipments continued. However, in terms of halting hostilities between Rome and the Vandals, that treaty was honored more in the breach than in the observance, and the Romans placed a high priority on recovering North Africa and regaining their control of grain from the Vandal Kingdom.

Sack of Rome 

The peace treaty of 442 did not halt Vandal raids in the western Mediterranean. Over the next 35 years, Gaiseric used his large naval fleet to loot the coasts of both the Eastern and Western Empires. After Attila the Hun's death in 453, however, the Romans turned their attention back to the Vandals, who were now in control of some of the richest lands formerly ruled by Rome.

In an effort to bring the Vandals into the fold of the Empire, Valentinian III offered the hand of his daughter, Eudocia, in marriage to Gaiseric's son Huneric when both Eudocia and Huneric were children. However, they had not yet wed when in 455, Valentinian III was murdered by accomplices of the usurper Petronius Maximus, who sought control of the Empire. Maximus immediately married Valentinian's widow, the Empress Licinia Eudoxia, and he also canceled Eudocia's betrothal to Huneric and married her instead to his own son, Palladius. Diplomacy between Rome and the Vandal Kingdom broke down. Eudoxia wrote a letter to Gaiseric, begging him to come to her aid. Claiming that the broken betrothal between Huneric and Eudocia invalidated his peace treaty with Valentinian, Gaiseric sacked Rome, rescuing Eudoxia, Eudocia, and Eudoxia's younger daughter Placidia (the latter was married to the future unrecognised emperor Olybrius). Maximus and Palladius were killed by an angry mob while fleeing the city.

The chronicler Prosper of Aquitaine offers the only 5th-century report that on 2 June 455, Pope Leo the Great received Gaiseric and implored him to abstain from murder and destruction by fire, and to be satisfied with pillage. The Vandals departed with countless valuables, including the spoils of the Temple in Jerusalem booty brought to Rome by Titus. Eudoxia and her daughters were taken to Carthage, where Eudocia married Huneric shortly thereafter.

The sack of Rome earned the Vandals association with senseless destruction through the noun vandalism.

Later years

The Vandal sack of Rome, piracy in the Mediterranean, and the Roman need to recover control of the grain trade made the destruction of the Vandal Kingdom a priority for the Roman Empire. The Western Roman Emperor Majorian began to organize an offensive in the summer of 458. A maritime force staged from Cartagena in Hispania would take Mauretania and then march on Carthage, while a simultaneous assault, commanded by Marcellinus, would retake Sicily. The Emperor assembled his fleet in 460, but Gaiseric learned of the impending assault and "put a scorched earth policy into effect in Mauretania - scouring the land and poisoning the wells in advance of the planned imperial offensive." In addition, Gaiseric led his own fleet against Majorian's force and defeated the Romans at Cartagena.

In 468, both the Western and Eastern Empires attempted to conquer Africa again with the "most ambitious campaign ever launched against the Vandal state." Primary sources suggest that the fleet numbered 1,113 ships and carried 100,000 men, but this figure has been rejected by modern historiography, with Heather suggesting 30,000 troops and 50,000 soldiers and sailors combined, based on 16,000 Roman soldiers conveyed on 500 ships in 532. Andy Merrills and Richard Miles have asserted that the operation was undoubtedly extensive and "deserves admiration for its logistical brilliance." At a naval battle in Cape Bon, Tunisia, the Vandals destroyed the Western fleet and part of the Eastern fleet through the use of fire ships. Following up the attack, the Vandals tried to invade the Peloponnese but were driven back by the Maniots at Kenipolis with heavy losses. In retaliation, the Vandals took 500 hostages at Zakynthos, hacked them to pieces, and threw the pieces overboard on the way back to Carthage.In the 470s, the Romans abandoned their policy of war against the Vandals. The Western Germanic general Ricimer reached a treaty with the Vandals, and in 476 Gaiseric was able to conclude a "perpetual peace" with Constantinople. Relations between the two states assumed a veneer of normality. From 477 onward, the Vandals produced their own coinage, although it was restricted to bronze and silver low-denomination coins. Although the low-denomination imperial money was replaced, the high-denomination was not, demonstrating in the words of Merrills "reluctance to usurp the imperial prerogative".

Gaiseric died on 25 January 477, 88 years of age. According to the law of succession which he had promulgated, the oldest male member of the royal house was to succeed. Thus he was succeeded by his son Huneric (477–484), who at first tolerated Nicene Christians, owing to his fear of Constantinople, but after 482 began to persecute Manichaeans and Niceanian. He also murdered many rivaling members of the Vandalic dynasty. The native Berbers of North Africa who were kept in line during Gaiseric's rule soon began revolts and invasions against the Vandals following Gaiseric's death and Huneric's strict religious laws. The Vandals started rapidly losing territory in modern-day western Algeria to the Kingdom of Altava, and by the end of Huneric's rule he completely lost control over the Aurès Mountains to king Masties, who established the kingdom of the Aurès in 483–484.

Gunthamund (484–496), his cousin and successor, sought internal peace with the Niceanians and ceased persecution once more. Externally, Vandal power had been declining since Gaiseric's death; Gunthamund lost large parts of Sicily to Theodoric's Ostrogoths and had to withstand increasing pressure from the native Berbers, whom raided everything inland up to the coast.

Gunthamund's successor Thrasamund (496–523) was a religious fanatic and hostile to Niceanians, but he contented himself with bloodless persecutions. In 510 the Frexenses Berber tribe under king Guenfan seized a portion of territory south of Thugga and established the kingdom of Dorsale, pushing the Vandals further out of inland. Around the 510s, migrating Laguatan berbers under king Cabaon captured Oea (modern Tripoli) and Sabratha and established a kingdom there, and began sacking Vandalic territories and destroyed various Vandalic settlements. Thrasamund attempted to crush him and retake his territory, but the expedition in 523 ended in a disastrous Vandalic defeat. He also allied with the Visigoths, but despite this alliance, Thrasamund failed to aid Theoderic when the Byzantine Navy ravaged the coast of southern Italy, preventing him from coming to the assistance of King Alaric of the Visigoths in the Battle of Vouillé, which contributed to Alaric's defeat.

Conquest by the Eastern Roman Empire 

Thrasamund's successor Hilderic (523–530) was the Vandal king who was most tolerant of Trinitarian Christians. He granted religious freedom, and consequently Chalcedonian synods were once more held in North Africa. However, he had little interest in war and left it to his nephew Hoamer. When the Vandals and the Berber kingdom of Dorsale came into conflict yet again, Hoamer suffered a decisive defeat by the Berbers led by Guenfan and his son Antalas. Following this, the Arian faction within the royal family led a revolt, and Hoamer's cousin Gelimer (530–534) became king. Hilderic, Hoamer, and their relatives were thrown into prison. In 533, Hilderic was executed when the Byzantine army approached Carthage.Byzantine Emperor Justinian I declared war, with the stated intention of restoring Hilderic to the Vandal throne. While an expedition was en route, Gelimer's brother Tzazo led a large part of the Vandal army and navy to Sardinia to deal with a rebellion by the Gothic nobleman Godas. This enabled the armies of the Byzantine Empire, commanded by Belisarius, to land unopposed  from Carthage. Gelimer quickly assembled an army and met Belisarius at the Battle of Ad Decimum, in the Vandals were prevailing until Gelimer's brother Ammatas and nephew Gibamund fell in battle. Gelimer then lost heart and fled. Belisarius quickly took Carthage as the surviving Vandals fought on.

Again, the Vandals fought well but broke, this time when Tzazo fell in battle. Belisarius quickly advanced to Hippo, second city of the Vandal Kingdom. In 534 Gelimer, besieged at Mount Pappua by the Herulian General Pharas, surrendered to the Byzantines, ending the Kingdom of the Vandals.

The Vandals' territory in North Africa (which is now northern Tunisia and eastern Algeria) became a Byzantine province. The best Vandal warriors were formed into five cavalry regiments, known as Vandali Iustiniani, and stationed on the Persian frontier. Some entered the private service of Belisarius. Gelimer himself was honourably treated and granted large estates in Galatia, where he lived to be an old man. He was also offered the rank of patrician but refused it because he was not willing to convert from Arianism to Nicene Christianity. In the words of historian Roger Collins: "The remaining Vandals were then shipped back to Constantinople to be absorbed into the imperial army," As a distinct ethnic unit they disappeared, either by fleeing to Spain or by being absorbed into the population of North Africa.

Religious policies

From their invasion of North Africa in 429 onward, the Vandals, who were predominantly followers of Arianism, persecuted Nicene Christians. This persecution began with the unfettered violence inflicted against the church during Gaiseric's invasion, but, with the legitimization of the Vandal Kingdom, the oppression became entrenched in "more coherent religious policies."
 Victor of Vita's History of the Vandal Persecution details the "wicked ferocity" inflicted against church property and attacks against "many… distinguished bishops and noble priests" in the first years of the conquest; similarly, Bishop Honoratus writes that "before our eyes men are murdered, women raped and we ourselves collapse under torture." Citing these and other corroborating sources, Merrills has argued that there is "little doubt" that the initial invasion was "brutally violent." He has also argued along with Richard Miles that the Vandals initially targeted the Nicene Church for financial rather than religious reasons, seeking to rob it of its wealth.

Once Gaiseric secured his hold over Numidia and Mauretania in the treaty of 435, he worked "to destroy the power of the Nicene church in his new territories by seizing the basilicas of three of the most intransigent bishops and expelling them from their cities." Similar policies continued with the capture of Carthage in 439 as the Vandal king made efforts to simultaneously advance the Arian church and oppress Nicene practices. Heather notes that four major churches within the city walls were confiscated for the Arians, and a ban was imposed on all Nicene services in areas in which Vandals settled; Gaiseric also had Quodvultdeus, Bishop of Carthage, and many of his clergy exiled from Africa and refused "to allow replacements to be ordained… so that the total number of Nicene bishops within the Vandal kingdom suffered a decline." Laymen were excluded from office and frequently suffered confiscation of their property.

However, diplomatic considerations took precedence over religious policy. In 454, at the request of Valentinian III, Gaiseric installed Deogratius as the new Bishop of Carthage, a position that had been left empty since Quodvultdeus's departure. Heather argues that this accession was intended to improve Vandal–Roman relations as Gaiseric negotiated the marriage of his son Huneric to the Princess Eudocia. However, after Valentinian was killed and Vandal relations with Rome and Constantinople worsened, Gaiseric renewed his oppressive religious policies, leaving the bishopric empty once again when Deogratius died in 457.

Heather has argues that Gaiseric's promotion of the Arian church, with the accompanying persecution of the Nicene church, had political motivations. He notes a "key distinction" between "the anti-Nicene character" of Gaiseric's actions in Proconsularis and the rest of his kingdom; persecution was most intense when it was in proximity to his Arian followers. Heather suggests that Arianism was a means for Gaiseric to keep his followers united and under control; wherever his people interacted with Niceanians, this strategy was threatened. However, Heather also notes that "personal belief must have also played a substantial role in Gaiseric's decision making."

Huneric, Gaiseric's son and successor, continued and intensified the repression of the Nicene church and attempted to make Arianism the primary religion in North Africa; indeed, much of Victor of Vita's narrative focuses on the atrocities and persecutions committed during Huneric's reign. Priests were forbidden to practice the liturgy, Homoousian books were destroyed, and almost 5,000 clergy were exiled into the desert. Violence continued with "men and women… subjected to a series of torments including scalping, forced labour and execution by sword and fire." In 483, Huneric issued a royal edict commanding all Chalcedonian bishops in Africa to attend a debate with Arian representatives. In the aftermath of this conference, he forbade Nicene clergy from assembling or carrying out baptisms or ordinations and ordered all Nicene churches to be closed and Nicene property confiscated. These churches were then turned over for the royal fisc or for Arian clerical use.

While primary sources reveal little about Gunthamund's religious policies, existing evidence does suggest that the new king was "generally better disposed towards the Chalcedonian faith than his predecessor [Huneric] had been" and maintained a period of tolerance. Gunthamund ended the desert exile of a bishop called Eugenius and also restored the Nicene shrine of Saint Agileus in Carthage.

Thrasamund ended his late brother's policies of tolerance when he ascended to the throne in 496. He reintroduced "harsh measures against the Catholic ecclesiastical hierarchy" but "worked to maintain positive relations with the Romano-African lay elite," his intention being to split the loyalties of the two groups.

Except for Hilderic, most Vandal kings persecuted Niceanians (as well as Donatists) to a greater or lesser extent, banning conversion for Vandals and exiling bishops.

Administration 
The administration of the Vandal Kingdom bears close resemblance to the Roman provincial administration of Africa. While it was staffed by local Africans, the currency and taxation system were a creative adaptation of Roman models and which were similar to ones administered by the Romans. Vandal troops were also fashioned similarly to the Roman model. Power and wealth in the Vandal state were led by a military landowning aristocracy and the political elite replaced and expropriated the largely absentee senatorial aristocracy. Other main sources of income included its take-over of the major grain and oil export region of the Romans, which had hitherto been the source of food for the major city of Rome. The wealth that the Vandal leaders accumulated were spent on luxurious town houses and religious buildings, according to literary sources and archeology.

See also
  Visigothic Kingdom
  Ostrogothic Kingdom
  Gepid Kingdom
  Lombard Kingdom
  Frankish Kingdom
  Suebic Kingdom of Galicia
  Vandal Sardinia
  Andalusia

Notes

Sources
 
 
 

 Heather, Peter (2007),  'Christianity and the Vandals in the Reign of Geiseric', Bulletin of the Institute of Classical Studies 50, pp. 137–146.
 Mass, Michael (ed.) (2014) The Cambridge Companion to the Age of Attila. Cambridge: Cambridge University Press, 
 

 Victor of Vita (1992) History of the Vandal Persecution trans. John Moorhead, Liverpool: Liverpool University Press, .

External links

 
Countries in ancient Africa
History of Corsica
Ancient Sicily
Ancient Tunisia
Algeria in the Roman era
Former countries in Europe
Ancient Libya
Medieval Tunisia
Medieval Libya
States and territories established in the 430s
States and territories disestablished in the 530s
Barbarian kingdoms